Kings and Queen is a 2004 French drama film directed by Arnaud Desplechin, starring Emmanuelle Devos and Mathieu Amalric. The film had its world premiere in the Competition section at the 61st Venice International Film Festival on 3 September 2004. It was released in France on 22 December 2004.

Plot
Nora Cotterelle, a woman in her 30s is caring for her ill father, Louis Jenssens.

While Nora tries to present a facade that all is well with her life, she is twice divorced and has a son, Elias, whose father is dead. Elias has behavior problems caused by autism.

Nora's present relationship is not going well, and she is soon to marry a businessman, while Elias is becoming increasingly withdrawn.

A parallel storyline follows her former lover and second husband, Ismaël Vuillard, a musician, with whom she had lived for seven years. He is given to strange behaviour, and as a result he has been committed to a mental hospital, from which he is planning to escape.

Nora learns that her father's digestive problems are actually cancer, and facing her father's death, Nora desperately seeks out Ismaël to ask that he reconnect with Elias, but he has mixed feelings about adopting her son. Moreover, he has met Arielle, another patient.

Cast

Release
The film had its world premiere in the Competition section at the 61st Venice International Film Festival on 3 September 2004. It was released in France on 22 December 2004.

Reception

Critical response
On review aggregator website Rotten Tomatoes, the film holds an approval rating of 86% based on 57 reviews, and an average rating of 7.5/10. The website's consensus reads: "A dryly comic, stylistically brave film." On Metacritic, the film has a weighted average score of 84 out of 100, based on 26 critics, indicating "universal acclaim".

Peter Bradshaw of The Guardian gave the film 4 out of 5 stars, calling it "rich, complex and deeply pleasing". Erica Abeel of Film Journal International wrote: "Its novelistic breadth, pitched intensity and on-the-fly shooting style pull the viewer smack-dab into the middle of these lives."

Accolades

References

External links
 
 

2004 films
French drama films
Louis Delluc Prize winners
Films directed by Arnaud Desplechin
Films with screenplays by Arnaud Desplechin
Films featuring a Best Actor César Award-winning performance
Films featuring a Best Actor Lumières Award-winning performance
Films featuring a Best Actress Lumières Award-winning performance
2000s French films